Eldorado is a community approximately one hour away  from Culiacán in the Mexican state of Sinaloa. It is about a 20-minute drive from "Las Arenitas", a small fishing town.

Populated places in Sinaloa